is a Japanese professional baseball player. He is a catcher for the Chiba Lotte Marines of Nippon Professional Baseball (NPB).

On April 10, 2022, Matsukawa caught Rōki Sasaki's perfect game. He also had three runs batted in during the game.

References

External links

2003 births
Living people
Nippon Professional Baseball catchers
Baseball people from Osaka Prefecture
Chiba Lotte Marines players
People from Hannan, Osaka